The 2007 Big Ten softball tournament was held at Buckeye Field on the campus of Ohio State University in Columbus, Ohio from May 10 through May 12, 2007. As the tournament winner, Ohio State earned the Big Ten Conference's automatic bid to the 2007 NCAA Division I softball tournament.

Format and seeding
The 2007 tournament was an eight team single-elimination tournament. The top eight teams based on conference regular season winning percentage earned invites to the tournament.

Tournament

Schedule

All-Tournament Team
 Designated Player: Katie Mitchell (Purdue)
 Utility Player: Jamee Juarez (Ohio State)
 Pitcher: Eileen Canney (Northwestern)
 Pitcher: Lorilyn Wilson (Michigan)
 Catcher: Sam Marder (Ohio State)
 First base: Garland Cooper (Northwestern)
 First base: Christina Douglas (Ohio State)
 Second base: Brittany Vanderink (Ohio State)
 Third base: Darcy Sengewald (Northwestern)
 Shortstop: Nycole Koyano (Ohio State)
 Outfielder: Katie Logan (Northwestern)
 Outfielder: Alessandra Giampaolo (Michigan)
 Outfielder: Courtney Pruner (Ohio State)

Tournament MVP
 Jamee Juarez (Ohio State)

References

Big Ten softball tournament
Tournament
Big Ten softball tournament